Founded in 1970, the James Madison baseball program played at Long Field at Mauck Stadium through the end of the 2009 season. In 2010 they opened play at Eagle Field at Veterans Memorial Park, the school's new baseball and softball complex. The "Diamond Dukes," as the team is known, have compiled a 1092-670-8 all-time record and have made the NCAA tournament nine times, most recently in 2011. The Dukes compete in the Sun Belt Conference. Billy Sample is JMU's most famous baseball alumnus, who played in 862 career major league games with the Texas Rangers, New York Yankees, and Atlanta Braves. In the 2006 season, JMU had the top-two home run hitters in Division I. One of them, Kellen Kulbacki, placed in the top five in all three of the triple crown categories. Kulbacki received the 2006 National Player of the Year award as a sophomore. In 2008, the Dukes won their first CAA Championship defeating Towson University qualifying the team for the 2008 NCAA Division I baseball tournament hosted by North Carolina State University in Raleigh, NC. The Dukes also won the CAA Championship in 2011 defeating Old Dominion University qualifying the team for the 2011 NCAA Division I baseball tournament.

References